James Hughes may refer to:

Sports
 James Hughes (boxer) (1965–1995), American flyweight boxer
 James Hughes (footballer, born 1885) (1885–1948), English footballer who played for Liverpool
 James Hughes (footballer, born 1911) (1911–?), English footballer who played for Bristol City
 James Hughes (ice hockey) (1906–1983), Canadian professional ice hockey player
 James Hughes (rugby union) (1886–1943), Australian rugby union player
 Jamie Hughes (footballer) (born 1977), English footballer
 Jamie Hughes (darts player) (born 1986), English darts player
 Jay Hughes (1874–1924), also known as Jim Hughes, American Major League Baseball pitcher, who played four seasons from 1898 to 1902
 Jim Hughes (1950s pitcher) (1923–2001), American baseball pitcher
 Jim Hughes (1970s pitcher) (born 1951), American baseball pitcher
 Jim Hughes (Canadian football) (born 1933), former Canadian football player
 Jim Hughes (footballer, born 1960), Scottish footballer
 Jim Hughes (footballer, born 1965), Scottish footballer
 Jimmy Hughes (footballer) (1909–1966), English footballer

Politicians
 James Hughes (British politician) (died 1845), British Member of Parliament for Grantham
 James Hughes (Irish politician) (1895–1948), Irish Fine Gael politician
 James Hughes (representative) (1823–1873), U.S. Representative from Indiana
 James A. Hughes (1861–1930), U.S. Representative from West Virginia
 James B. Hughes (1805–1873), American newspaper publisher, state legislator for Ohio
 James F. Hughes (1883–1940), U.S. Representative from Wisconsin
 James H. Hughes (1867–1953), American lawyer and politician, U.S. Senator from Delaware
 James Joseph Hughes (1856–1941), Canadian Senator and Member of Parliament
 James Madison Hughes (1809–1861), U.S. Representative from Missouri
 James P. Hughes (1874–1961), Justice of the Indiana Supreme Court
 Jim Hughes (politician) (born 1964), Ohio politician

Others
 James Hughes (bishop) (1894–1979), Anglican bishop
 James Hughes (sociologist) (born 1961), American sociologist and bioethicist
 James D. Hughes (born 1922), retired American Air Force lieutenant general
 Jim Hughes (academic), professor of comparative politics at the London School of Economics
 Jimmy Hughes (British musician) (born 1958), British punk rock/New Wave bassist
 Jimmy Hughes (singer) (born 1938), American soul singer
 Jimmy Hughes, Rookie Cop, American television show (1953)
 James Hughes, son of John Hughes (filmmaker)

See also  
 Hughes (surname)